Mohamed Ebeid (born 11 April 1911) was an Egyptian sprinter. He competed in the men's 400 metres at the 1936 Summer Olympics.

References

External links
 

1911 births
Year of death missing
Athletes (track and field) at the 1936 Summer Olympics
Egyptian male sprinters
Olympic athletes of Egypt
Place of birth missing